Nguyễn Thúy Hiền (born 3 November 1979) is a Vietnamese former wushu taolu athlete. She is the most renowned wushu athlete of all time, having been a seven-time world champion. Due to her numerous achievements, she was voted as the best Vietnamese female athlete of the 20th century.

Early life 
Thúy Hiền grew up in the  Gia Lâm District of Hanoi. Her father was a player at the football club Song Lam Nghe An FC, and her sister Nguyễn Thuý Vinh became a national player in badminton. 

At the age of eleven, she and her sister began practicing shaolinquan in secret from her mother but with support from their father. Due to her success in various competitions, she was selected by Hoàng Vĩnh Giang of the Hanoi Department of Physical Education to enter the first wushu class in Hanoi after just a year of training. She started training with Nguyễn Tùng Lâm, Nguyễn Xuân Thi, and Chinese coaches Trần Húc Hồng and Phan Hán Quang. After further success, she was selected to the national team in 1993 at the age of fourteen.

Career

1993–1997 
After joining the Vietnamese Wushu Team, Thúy Hiền's international debut was at the 1993 World Wushu Championships in Kuala Lumpur, Malaysia, where she became the first world champion in wushu for Vietnam by winning the daoshu event. She also won a silver medal in changquan at the competition. Her world title at just fourteen years old set in motion the popularity of wushu across Vietnam, and Thúy Hiền began to become a household name. A year later, she competed in the women's changquan event at the 1994 Asian Games and finished fifth overall. Another year later, she competed at the 1995 World Wushu Championships in Baltimore, USA, and was a triple-medalist, winning a silver medal in daoshu and two bronze medals in changquan and qiangshu. 

In early 1996, she was sent to train with the Guangdong wushu team for ten months, then appeared at the 4th Asian Wushu Championships in Manila, Philippines, and won a silver medal in changquan and a bronze medal in daoshu. After her time in China, she competed in the wushu event at the 1997 Southeast Asian Games in Jakarta, Indonesia, and won gold medals in changquan and daoshu. Twenty days later, she competed in the 1997 World Wushu Championships in Rome, Italy, and was a triple medalist again by winning two silver medals in changquan and daoshu and becoming the world champion in qiangshu.

1998–2003 
At the 1998 Asian Games in Bangkok, Thailand, Thúy Hiền competed once again in women's changquan and was able to win the silver medal. She was a triple medalist once again at the 1999 World Wushu Championships Hong Kong, this time by being world champion in changquan and winning silver medals in her weapons events. The following year, she returned to the Asian Wushu Championships in Saigon to win a gold medal in daoshu and two silver medals in changquan and qiangshu, but lost the all-around title by 0.01 points. 

In the 2001 Southeast Asian Games in Kuala Lumpur, Malaysia, she became a triple gold medalist. Shortly after in the 2001 World Wushu Championships in Yerevan, Armenia, she was also a triple gold medalist. She intended to retire after this competition due to illness, but perhaps due to her numerous successes, she remained a member of the wushu team. 

A year later, she competed in the 2002 Asian Games in Busan, South Korea, but only placed in fourth in women's changquan. The following year, Thúy Hiền competed in the 2003 World Wushu Championships in Macau where she became the world champion in daoshu. At the 2003 Southeast Asian Games a few weeks later, she was the torch bearer for the opening ceremony. At the wushu competition, she was once again a triple gold medalist in changquan, daoshu, and qiangshu. After sustaining a injury at the competition, Thúy Hiền officially declared her retirement in 2005, becoming a coach and a judge in wushu with a permanent position the Hanoi Department of Physical Education and Sports.

Post-retirement and personal life 
Nguyen married Vietnamese singer Tú Dưa in 2002, whom she met in a concert in 1998. In the 2000s, they opened a clothing store together as a side business to Thúy Hiền's coaching. The couple divorced in 2006 and Thuy Hien won custody of both of their daughters. She married her second husband, Tiến Dũng, on 30 March 2019 after dating for more than a year.

Due to her constant training and injuries in her youth, she suffers from stomach and spinal pain. She has stated that her relationships and pain struggles has left her to feel lonely and depressed at times.

Competitive history

Awards 
By the Government of Vietnam:

 Labor Order, 3rd class (1993)
 Labor Order, 2nd class (1997)
 Labor Order, 1st class (2001)
 "Outstanding Athlete" (1993, 1996, 1997, 1998, 1999, 2001)

See also 

 List of Asian Games medalists in wushu

References

External links 

 "Face of SEA Games – Wushu athlete Nguyen Thuy Hien" (In Vietnamese)
 "Nguyen Thuy Hien – the untold story of the 'golden wushu girl'" (In Vietnamese)

1979 births
Living people
Sportspeople from Hanoi
Vietnamese wushu practitioners
Asian Games silver medalists for Vietnam
Asian Games medalists in wushu
Wushu practitioners at the 1994 Asian Games
Wushu practitioners at the 1998 Asian Games
Wushu practitioners at the 2002 Asian Games
Southeast Asian Games gold medalists for Vietnam
Southeast Asian Games medalists in wushu
Competitors at the 1997 Southeast Asian Games
Competitors at the 2001 Southeast Asian Games
Competitors at the 2003 Southeast Asian Games
People from Hanoi
Medalists at the 1998 Asian Games